Jørgen Herlufsen (born 4 March 1964) is a Danish sports shooter. He competed at the 1988 Summer Olympics and the 1992 Summer Olympics.

References

External links
 

1964 births
Living people
Danish male sport shooters
Olympic shooters of Denmark
Shooters at the 1988 Summer Olympics
Shooters at the 1992 Summer Olympics
People from Skive Municipality
Sportspeople from the Central Denmark Region
20th-century Danish people